Raute is a small Sino-Tibetan language of Dadeldhura District, Sudurpashchim Province, Nepal. Some speakers are nomadic.

Alternate names include Boto boli, Khamchi, Raji, Rajwar, Ra’te, Rautya, Rautye (Ethnologue).

Geographical distribution
Ethnologue lists the following locations for historical and present locations of the Raute.

Jogbudha and Sirsa VDC's, Dadeldhura District, Sudurpashchim Province: in Karnali and Mahakali (Kali) rivers watershed regions (800 settled)
Former nomadic camp in Surkhet district, Karnali Province
Midwest and far west forest regions (about 25 nomads).

References

Raji–Raute languages
Languages of Nepal
Languages of Sudurpashchim Province
Languages of Karnali Province